Eastern Suburbs (now known as the Sydney Roosters) competed in the 25th New South Wales Rugby League (NSWRL) premiership in 1932.

Details
Coach - Frank Burge
Line up - Cyril Abotomey, Perc Atkinson, Morrie Boyle, Dave Brown, Richard Brown, John Clarke, Gordon Fletcher, Hilton Delaney, J. Guinery, Billy Hong, Jack Lynch, Jack Morrison, Ernie Norman, Eugene Paillas, W. Rayner, Les Rogers, Sid 'Joe' Pearce, Roy Shankland, J. Spence, Ray Stehr, Viv Thicknesse, Fred Tottey,

Ladder

Season summary

 Semifinalists

References

External links
Rugby League Tables and Statistics

Sydney Roosters seasons
East